Celestí Boada i Salvador (1902 – 18 October 1939) was a Spanish catalan politician. He was born in Santa Coloma de Gramanet. He was a member of the Republican Left of Catalonia. He supported the Second Spanish Republic in the Spanish Civil War. Because he was a Catalan nationalist, he was executed by firing squad by the government of Francisco Franco in Campo de la Bota after the Nationalist victory.

References

Bibliography
Carreras García, Montserrat. La República i la Guerra Civil a Santa Coloma de Gramenet. 208 págs. Aj. de Sta. Coloma, 1986. (En catalán).
Ruiz Santín, Fco. Javier. «El cas Celestí Boada» en Grupo de Historia José Berruezo. Una ciutat dormitori sota el franquisme: Santa Coloma de Gramenet, 1939-1975. Barcelona, Ediciones Carena, 2010 , págs. 157-166. (En catalán).

External links
Santa Coloma de Gramenet inaugura una escultura pública dels artistes Jordi Dalmau i Lídia Górriz en homenatge a l'alcalde republicà afusellat Celestí Boada, vilaweb.cat, 20 de enero de 2007.
Franco hizo fusilar a 42 alcaldes de ERC, e-noticies.es, 10 de abril de 2009.

1902 births
1939 deaths
Republican Left of Catalonia politicians
Alcaldes of the Second Spanish Republic
People executed by Francoist Spain
Executed politicians
People executed by firing squad